Past Masters is a two-disc compilation album set by the English rock band the Beatles. It was originally released as two separate volumes on 7 March 1988, as part of the first issue of the band's catalogue on compact disc. The set compiles every song released commercially by the band that was not available on the Beatles' 12 original UK albums or the US Magical Mystery Tour LP. It includes liner notes by Beatles historian Mark Lewisohn. The majority of the Past Masters set consists of A- and B-sides from the band's singles, including single versions of songs that appeared in a different form on the band's albums. Also included are the full contents of the UK-only Long Tall Sally EP, two German-language tracks, a song recorded for the American market, and a track released on a charity compilation album.

Although Past Masters is not a studio album and is instead a compilation, it is considered to be the Beatles' 14th (and final) major release. This occurred when the Beatles' core catalog was standardized in 1987, followed by the official re-releases in 2009.

Release history 
Past Masters was originally issued as two separate CDs, Past Masters, Volume One and Past Masters, Volume Two, on 7 March 1988. The two volumes were included in The Beatles Box Set. A double LP set, titled Past Masters, Volumes One & Two (also titled simply Past Masters),  was subsequently released in the US on 24 October 1988 and in the UK on 10 November 1988. Both volumes were also released as a double cassette bundle on 7 March 1988.

The double set was re-released on CD, titled simply Past Masters, on 9 September 2009, as part of the remastering of the original Beatles catalogue, and was included in The Beatles (The Original Studio Recordings) box set. This release includes stereo mixes of both "From Me to You" and "Thank You Girl", whereas the original 1988 issue contained the two tracks in mono. Mark Lewisohn's name was removed from this reissue. The Beatles in Mono box set, released at the same time, includes the album Mono Masters, which contains a similar track list of dedicated mono mixes.

A remastered-for-vinyl version of the Past Masters double LP set was released on 12 November 2012.

Track listings 
The dates provided are the dates when the tracks were originally released, not recorded.

All songs written and composed by Lennon–McCartney, except where noted. Tracks are in stereo, except where noted.

Past Masters, Volume One 

Contains recordings originally released between 1962 and 1965:
Eleven tracks from British singles (including B-sides)
Both tracks from the German single "Komm, Gib Mir Deine Hand" / "Sie Liebt Dich"
All four tracks from the Long Tall Sally EP
The US-only track "Bad Boy", from the album Beatles VI (although the song was also on the 1966 A Collection of Beatles Oldies album released by Parlophone)

Past Masters, Volume Two 

Contains recordings originally released between 1965 and 1970:
Fourteen tracks from British singles (including B-sides)
The "Wildlife" version of "Across the Universe" from the charity album No One's Gonna Change Our World
 The 1970 stereo mix of "The Inner Light" had only been previously available on a limited edition 1981 EP.

Past Masters, Volumes One & Two

Charts and certifications

Past Masters: Volume 1

Charts

Certifications

Past Masters: Volume 2

Charts

Certifications

Past Masters

Charts

Certifications

References 

1988 compilation albums
Albums produced by George Martin
Albums recorded at Trident Studios
Apple Records compilation albums
B-side compilation albums
The Beatles compilation albums
Capitol Records compilation albums
Compilation album series
Compilation albums published posthumously
German-language compilation albums
Parlophone compilation albums
Albums recorded at Apple Studios